The El Salvador International is an international badminton tournament held in San Salvador, El Salvador. The event is part of the Badminton World Federation's Future Series and part of the Badminton Pan America's Circuit.

Past winners

Performance by nations

References

Badminton tournaments in El Salvador
2018 establishments